The Housing and Community Development Act of 1974, (12 U.S.C. 1706e), is a United States federal law that, among other provisions, amended the Housing Act of 1937 to create Section 8 housing, authorizes "Entitlement Communities Grants" to be awarded by the United States Department of Housing and Urban Development, and created the National Institute of Building Sciences.  Under Section 810 of the Act the first federal  Urban Homesteading program was created.

The S. 3066 legislation was passed by the United States 93rd Congressional session and enacted into law by the 38th President of the United States Gerald Ford on August 22, 1974.

See also
 Mobile Home Construction and Safety Standards Act of 1974

References

External links
 Entitlement Communities Grants information, from hud.gov
 24 C.F.R. PART 590—URBAN HOMESTEADING
 
 
 

1974 in law
93rd United States Congress
United States federal housing legislation
Mortgage industry of the United States
Community development
Urban economics
Urban politics in the United States
1974 in the United States
Housing legislation